Marvin Dekil, (born 13 October 1969) is a Nigerian environmental scientist, lawyer, academician and politician. He is an oil remediation expert and the pioneer project coordinator of the Hydrocarbon Pollution Remediation Project (HYPREP), the agency responsible for the comprehensive environmental assessment and remediation of oil-impacted sites in Ogoniland and the Niger Delta region of Nigeria. He was Technical Lead, UNEP Environmental Assessment of Ogoniland Project and a Technical Adviser to Rivers State Commissioner for Environment. In 2017, Marvin was appointed as a project coordinator for HYPREP by Nigeria's former minister of Environment and current Deputy Secretary General of United Nations, Amina Mohammed.

Early life and education
Marvin Dekil was born in 1969 in Ogoni, Rivers state, Nigeria. He attended Akpor Grammar School, Ozuoba Port Harcourt and obtained WASC O’ Level before proceeding to the University of Port Harcourt, graduating with B. Sc in Microbiology. He obtained the MSc Environmental Pollution Control from Department of Fuel and Energy, University of Leeds UK and Ph.D in Environmental Science from the University of Bradford.

Marvin Dekil is also a Lawyer and holds a BL from the Nigerian Law School and Qualifying Law Degree, LLM from the Birkbeck College University of London. He is alumnus of Kellog College and Said Business School University of Oxford.

Career
Marvin Dekil was World Wide Fund International Prince Bernhard Scholar at the University of Leeds United Kingdom. He has been consultant to various multinational and international organizations in United Kingdom and Nigeria, including the United Nations Environment Programme UNEP, IBM Global Services, AstraZeneca, Environment Agency England,,  International Oil Companies including Shell Nigeria (SPDC), Eni/Agip, and Federal and State governments in Nigeria. He was part of  the government of Nigeria delegation to United Nations Climate Change Conference in Katowice  Poland, Madrid Spain and Earth Summit Rio +20, Rio de Janeiro, Brazil. He is a Fellow of the Nigeria Institute of Management Consultants.

Dekil who is an expert in contaminated land remediation was appointed by President Muhammadu Buhari and Amina J. Mohammed, then Nigeria Minister of Environment now Deputy Secretary General of the United Nations to lead the first ever government of Nigeria oil pollution clean up programme, Hydrocarbon Pollution Remediation Project (HYPREP) and implement the United Nations Environment Programme UNEP report on Ogoniland.

Dekil obtained a qualifying law degree, LLM from Birbeck College, University of London, and is called to the Nigerian Bar. He is Managing Director/CEO of Dexcom Solution Ltd and Managing Partner at M.B.Dekil & Co. Perfection Chambers Law firm and was previously Associate Attorney at Afe Babalola SAN Emmanuel Chambers Law office Port Harcourt.

Awards and fellowships
 World Wildlife Fund (International) Postgraduate Scholar (Prince Bernhard Scholarship for Nature Conservation), University of Leeds.
 Fellow, Nigeria Institute of Management Consultants
 UNEP Certificate in Environmental Assessment
 Member, Chartered Institution of Wastes Management, UK
 Member, Nigeria Environmental Society

References

Living people
Alumni of the University of Bradford
Alumni of the University of Leeds
Alumni of the University of London
Alumni of the University of Oxford
Nigerian Law School alumni
20th-century Nigerian lawyers
Nigerian scientists
United Nations Environment Programme
21st-century Nigerian lawyers
1969 births